Father Marty  is a story arc of the Philippine comic strip series Pugad Baboy, created by Pol Medina Jr. and originally published in the Philippine Daily Inquirer. This particular story arc lasts 21 strips long. In 1997, the story arc was reprinted in Pugad Baboy 9, the ninth book compilation of the comic strip series.

Synopsis
Marty, Bab's childhood friend has come home from Rome after being ordained a Catholic priest the past year. Capitalizing on his friendship with a man of the cloth, Bab assumes that he could get away with petty familiarity with Father Marty. For instance, he lazily proclaims, "The usual, my friend", as he is about to confess his sins. Father Marty seems mildly shocked by his friend's behavior, as he is by little Paltik's irreverent questions, but he good-naturedly thinks nothing of these events. He, however, has no qualms participating in a drinking session with Tomas and Ka Noli. 

Senator Cabalfin comes to confession one time, and Father Marty is hard put hearing of his sins, his hair becoming disheveled and also growing a five-o'clock shadow. They were indeed numerous and the Senator actually had several pages of notes on his sins, arranged in alphabetical order to help his memory. As the Senator hits "G" for "Graft", Father Marty takes a break to have a bite to eat. Taking the opportunity for some mischief, Bab takes his place in the confessional and hears out the rest of Senator Cabalfin's confession. The Senator later learns the truth (after trying to negotiate his penance) and threatens to have Bab secretly executed. Bab, however, reminds the Senator that he, Bab, had his confession notes. Not content with the mischief he had caused, Bab next hears the confession of Tiny, not known if this took place the following day since before the Senator began his long confession, Father Marty instinctively requested everyone else to return the following day. Tiny obliquely intimates that she had seen a video of activities of a sexual nature. When asked to indicate who starred in the film, Tiny pushes the video cassette towards Bab, causing Bab to scream. Tiny then discovers Bab inside the confessional. Both she and Senator Cabalfin warn him not to spill their dark little secrets.

Taking his mischief further, Bab takes Father Marty to see a Marilyn Chambers film. Reacting to Bab's inappropriate behavior, Father Marty opines that probably the reason why Bab had lost his respect for men of the cloth, was because he had seen the films Priest and Primal Fear. He tells Bab that priests were men too, and that it was not reasonable to assume that since one priest may have done wrong, then all priests were evil. In the end, Bab changes his tune, and accepts the fact that he had to treat his friend with the respect accorded to a man of God.

Pop culture references
 The video Tiny had seen was a controversial clip about Filipino talent manager Jojo Veloso, who made the headlines in 1996 over a series of video clips apparently fondling his male wards.
 Although Fr Marty appears on the covers of the 16th and 18th books, this is merely due to a reunion of sorts of all entire Pugad Baboy cast, including certain minor and extra characters. However, Father Marty himself would reappear in strips of the 19th book, albeit as a background character without lines. A second reappearance in Pugad Baboy XX, this time in one whole strip with many lines, implies that he has moved back to Pugad Baboy and is carrying out his holy duties there. In this appearance, apparently, his has shown signs of the same wacky behavior as the rest of the residents, though is still forgivable for a priest.
 The primary gag of the arc is the EXTREMELY LONG list of Senator Cabalfin's sins, a reference to the corruption the Philippine government has, especially in recent times, been infamous for.
 Although it has not yet been verified with the author, the character of Fr. Marty gets his name from a real Filipino Salesian priest who is a friend of Pol Medina himself.

References

 

Pugad Baboy